Edwin Torres (born 1958) is a Nuyorican performance poet.  His work incorporates vocal and physical improvisation.  He is the author of Ameriscopia, One Night: Poems for the Sleepy, Yes Thing No Thing, and several other poetic books.  He also has produced recordings titled Oceano Rise, Novo, and Holy Kid.  He is a member of the L=A=N=G=U=A=G=E school.

Early years
Torres's parents moved from Puerto Rico and settled in the borough of The Bronx in New York City. His father died when he was young and he was then raised by his mother and her brother Martin. He received his primary and secondary education in New York.

Nuyorican Poets Cafe

In 1989 Torres began working as a graphic designer and a year later he discovered the Nuyorican Poets Cafe, which inspired his creative instincts.  Torres created a movement which he called "Interactive Eclectrcism", which combines movement, audience participation, music and songs.  The Nuyorican Poets Cafe not only opened its door for his creation but it also opened the doors to a new world of reading poetry.  Torres also created the "Poets Neurotica", where dancers and musicians performed alongside two to four poets.  He was a member of "Real Live Poetry" from 1993–99, performing and conducting workshops across the US and overseas.

Torres has represented New York in the 1992 National Poetry Slam, celebrated in Boston, and he has won the Nuyorican Poets Cafe First Annual Prize for Poetry with his poem "Po-Mo Griot".

He has also appeared on MTV's Spoken Word Unplugged and the Charlie Rose Show and been featured on Newsweek, in Rolling Stone Magazine and in New York Magazine. His poem, "I Saw Your Empire State Building" was included in the book, Words In Your Face: A Guided Tour Through Twenty Years of the New York City Poetry Slam in the chapter which dealt with the poetry slam community's response to 9/11, and his work has appeared in numerous anthologies such as Aloud: Voices from the Nuyorican Poets Cafe, Short Fuse: The Global Anthology of New Fusion Poetry,  and Heights of the Marvelous: A New York Anthology, among many others.

Other performances
Besides performing at the Nuyorican Poets Cafe, Torres has performed at the Guggenheim Museum, Lincoln Center for the Performing Arts and the Museum of Modern Art, amongst other venues.

Written works
Torres' poems include:
"15 Minutes";
"Gigabyte Me - How Much Ram In Your Summer Of Love?";
"Lessering In Lessage";
"Lounging In The Age Of Aquarius";
"Mirror-Fucation";
"Mister Hay's Trippy Moebius";
"Peesacho";
"Terra Quad"

Torres' books include:
* Ameriscopia One Night: Poems for the Sleepy Yes Thing No Thing In the Function of External Circumstances The PoPedology of an Ambient Language Please Onomalingua: noise songs and poetry The All-Union Day of the Shock Worker Fractured Humorous Lung Poetry (chapbook)
 I Hear Things People Haven't Really Said (chapbook)
 SandHomméNomadNo'' (chapbook)

See also

List of Puerto Rican writers
List of Puerto Ricans
Puerto Rican poetry
Puerto Rican literature

References

External links
Poetry Foundation

1958 births
Living people
Puerto Rican poets
20th-century Puerto Rican poets
21st-century Puerto Rican poets
Place of birth missing (living people)
Puerto Rican male writers